KWB could refer to:
 Dewadaru Airport, Karimunjawa, Indonesia, IATA code
 Kew Bridge railway station, London, England, National Rail code